Emsland Nuclear Power Station is a nuclear reactor located in the district of Emsland, Germany just south of the Lingen Nuclear Power Plant.  The reactor has 193 fuel elements totaling a core weight of 103 tons.  It is a Konvoi type reactor.

It is owned by RWE Power AG. 

There have been no events higher than 0 in the INES scale.

References 

Nuclear power stations in Germany
RWE
Buildings and structures in Emsland
Economy of Lower Saxony